Liege lord may refer to:

 Homage (feudal) lord or vassal
 Liege Lord, speed/power metal band

See also
 Liege (disambiguation)
 Lord (disambiguation)